Limerick, California may refer to:
 Camanche, California
 San Ramon, California